Carlos Santos (born 1986) is a Puerto Rican actor and comedian best known for playing Chris Morales in the Netflix original series Gentefied. Santos was also the host of MTV treses show MiTRL.

Career

Carlos is an actor and comedian based out of Los Angeles. He is known for his work on MTV Tres. His recent television credits include Last Man on Earth (FOX), 2 Broke Girls (CBS), and the political comedy film Yo Soy un Político (HBO). Most recently he appears on the Netflix comedy Gentefied as aspiring chef Chris Morales. He performs regularly at the Upright Citizens Brigade Theatre co-hosting the only All-Latino Comedy Variety show "Spanish Aqui Presents" the 1st Friday of every month. He was born and raised in Puerto Rico.

Filmography

Film

Television

References

External links
 

1981 births
Puerto Rican comedians
Puerto Rican male actors
American male film actors
American male television actors
American male voice actors
Living people
Male actors from Los Angeles
Comedians from California
American male comedians